Walkin' in the Rain with the One I Love was an R&B single in 1972 for the soul trio Love Unlimited, a studio group created by singer/producer Barry White. The main vocalists were female singers Glodean James, her sister, Linda James, and their cousin Diane Taylor. Glodean would eventually become White's wife in 1974; the couple would split up in 1988, though they never divorced.

The song is notable for White's vocal appearance as a voice on the telephone. The lush sound and romantic atmosphere led to this becoming Love Unlimited's first hit record, eventually rising to #14 both on the U.S. Billboard Hot 100 and in the UK, as well as reaching #6 on the Soul Singles chart in the spring of 1972.

The record sold over a million copies, thus receiving a gold record for its sales. It would precede White's debut as a solo act on the Billboard charts by one year, when he hit #1 R&B with "I'm Gonna Love You Just A Little More Baby" in May 1973.

Chart history

Weekly charts

Year-end charts

References 

1972 singles
1972 songs
Songs written by Barry White
Uni Records singles